are votive slips, stickers or placards posted on the gates or buildings of Shinto shrines and Buddhist temples in Japan. Unlike , which bear the name of the shrine,  bear the name of the worshipper, and can be purchased pre-printed with common names at temples and shrines throughout Japan, as well as at stationery stores and video game centres.  were originally made from wooden slats, but have been made of paper since the Edo period.

A single senjafuda measures 1.6  in width and 4.8  in height. This gives the  a ratio of 1:3. A frame is drawn inside this space which contains the lettering or pictures.

Ordinarily, the designs were used to commemorate a visit to a temple or shrine and printed with simple monochromatic schemes, but eventually aesthetic sense gave way to colorful variations and designs. This variation is called  which roughly translated to "flower business card."

History 
 were first produced in the Heian period (794–1185) when shrine worshipers made pilgrimages to visits to many shrines and worship the Buddhist goddess of mercy, Kannon. They were not originally made of paper, they were first made from wooden slats that were hung from the gates of Kannon temples by nails made of bamboo. The slats were carved out with the visitors' name, area of origin and often included a prayer for a good life and afterlife.

There are two styles of : the older style, and the newer style, .  are basic black ink on white paper. The ink used is so strong that after the printed  are placed on the shrine or temple gate, years later when the paper is peeled away, the ink remains.

Like many things during the Edo period,  were regulated, with the number of colours on a person's  limited to their class and place in society.

Because of this, collectors who enjoyed the many designs and colors of  began meeting to exchange them with one another; first, the meetings took place at private homes, and then later were arranged for public places like restaurants and expensive tea houses. According to Kiritani's Vanishing Japan, the oldest surviving invitation card to a  meeting dates back to 1799. Due to the growing popularity of  meetings, the government enforced a law forbidding their trading, which did not stop the meetings from taking place.  meetings continue to this day, with collectors and aficionados alike meeting to share and trade their own designs as well as admire others.

He collected tens of thousands of slips, and a fellow collector and popular art enthusiast, Gertrude Bass Warner, purchased much of his collection. It currently resides at the University of Oregon Knight Library Special Collections & University Archives, part of the Gertrude Bass Warner Collection, and examples are viewable online at UO Oregon Digital.

Construction 
 used to be made from rice paper with ink called , and were pasted on with a starchy rice paste. The paste  was applied with something called  – two brushes about 30 degrees apart, with a clip on the other side of the brushes, allowing  to be pasted in out of reach areas, leaving others to wonder exactly how they got up there.

In the present day,  are made from printed paper, and are rarely made traditionally through wood block printing. Wooden slat , however, are still produced, and are worn as a necklace or used for key chain and cell phone ornaments. The ones made from paper are pre-printed with common names; machines are also available that can produce custom  with adhesive backings.

Famous figures 
They mainly produced , due to the expensive of the ukiyo-e printing process.

Senrei Sekioka was one of the foremost Japanese experts of  history; Iseman and Frederick Starr were also important members of the  during the Meiji and Taishō eras.

Modern-day  
 are also sold as stickers which do not require separate paste. As stickers, they are also placed in books and on personal items for identification and decoration.

Gallery

See also

Notes

References
 Gordenker, Alice, "So, What the Heck is That?  Shrine tags", Japan Times, 18 November 2010, p. 13.

External links 
 
 World of Senjafuda University of Oregon
 Gallery of senjafuda Christenson Collection of Miniature Japanese Woodblock Prints

Japanese culture
Buddhism in the Edo period
Ukiyo-e
Buddhist religious objects
Shinto religious objects
Japanese words and phrases